Hunainath  is a village development committee in Darchula District in the Mahakali Zone of western Nepal. At the time of the 1991 Nepal census it had a population of 1631.It is named after the Hunainath, a god in Nepal.

References

External links
UN map of the municipalities of Darchula District

Populated places in Darchula District